David Michael Rucker (born September 1, 1957) is an American former professional baseball pitcher, who played in Major League Baseball (MLB) from 1981 to 1988, primarily as a relief pitcher. Rucker attended Eisenhower High School and University of LaVerne where he was drafted in 1978 by the Detroit Tigers and joined the big league team, in 1981. In 1983, he was traded to the St. Louis Cardinals for Doug Bair. In 1985, Rucker was traded to the Philadelphia Phillies for Bill Campbell and Iván DeJesús. His MLB career came to an end, following the 1988 season, spent with the Pittsburgh Pirates.

References

External links

Dave Rucker at Pura Pelota (Venezuelan Professional Baseball League)

1957 births
Baseball players from California
Buffalo Bisons (minor league) players
Detroit Tigers players
Evansville Triplets players
Lakeland Tigers players
La Verne Leopards baseball players
Leones del Caracas players
American expatriate baseball players in Venezuela
Living people
Major League Baseball pitchers
Montgomery Rebels players
Oklahoma City 89ers players
St. Louis Cardinals players
Philadelphia Phillies players
Pittsburgh Pirates players
Portland Beavers players
Sportspeople from San Bernardino, California
UCLA Bruins baseball players
Mat-Su Miners players